The Notre-Dame-en-Vaux is a Roman Catholic church located in Châlons-en-Champagne. The cathedral is a major masterpiece in Marne.

History

Started around 1157, ended in 1217.

The church was classified a historic monument in 1840.
In 1998 it was registered on the World Heritage List by UNESCO under the title of "roads to St Jacques de Compostela in France".

Gallery

References

External links

 High-resolution 360° Panoramas and Images of Notre-Dame-en-Vaux | Art Atlas

Churches in Marne (department)
World Heritage Sites in France